Hiller may refer to:

 Hiller (surname)
 Hiller, Pennsylvania
 Hiller Aircraft Corporation:
 Hiller Hornet
 Hiller Flying Platform
 Tanner-Hiller Airport
 Hiller Aviation Museum
 Hiller X-18
 Fairchild Hiller FH-227
 YH-32 Hornet